Václav Voska (21 October 1918 – 20 August 1982) was a Czech film actor.

Selected filmography
 Bohemian Rapture (1947)
 Jan Žižka (1955)
 Against All (1956)
  (1968, TV film)
 The Longing of Sherlock Holmes (1972)
 Panna a netvor (1978)

References

Bibliography
 Hardy, Phil. The BFI Companion to Crime. A&C Black, 1997.

External links

1918 births
1982 deaths
Czech male film actors
Czech male television actors